Koshi Highway or H08 is a 390 km long planned highway located in Province No. 1 of Nepal. Rani at Biratnagar is starting point of the road which is connected to Jogbani in India and Kimathanka is the end point of the Koshi Highway, which is connected to Chinese town Chentang.

Almost all track has been open on this corridor, only 14 km of track was remaining to open in 2021. The work was awarded to Nepal Army to open the remaining track though most of the portion of the road is not blacktopped yet. It is one of the major highways of Nepal.

See also
List of roads in Nepal

References

Highways in Nepal